Asura melanopyga is a moth of the  family Erebidae. It is found in Taiwan.

References

melanopyga
Moths described in 1918
Moths of Taiwan